Majcni is a small settlement northeast of Štorje in the Municipality of Sežana in the Littoral region of Slovenia.

References

External links

Majcni on Geopedia

Populated places in the Municipality of Sežana